Exoteleia succinctella is a moth of the family Gelechiidae. It is found in the Alps, on the Balkan Peninsula and in Bulgaria.

The wingspan is about 14 mm. The forewings are brownish-grey. The hindwings are light grey.

The larvae feed on Pinus mugo.

References

Moths described in 1872
Exoteleia